The Langlo River, a river that is part of the Murray-Darling basin, is located in South West Queensland, Australia.

Location and features
The river flows generally in a southerly direction and forms a series of braided channels flowing through mostly uninhabited plains past Baykool and Nungil. It veers to the southeast near Lynton Hills and crosses the Diamantina Developmental Road near Meecha before reaching its confluence with the Warrego River. The Langlo River is joined by seventeen tributaries including the Ward River and descends  over its  course.

The river's catchment is mostly composed of natural downs country, mostly used for grazing cattle and sheep, vegetated with Flinders and Mitchell Grass, interspersed stony ridges and red stony plains and bisected by numerous creeks. The underlying geology is Middle Cretaceous sandstone with areas of limestone and mudstone.

See also

References

Rivers of Queensland
South West Queensland
Tributaries of the Darling River